Monster Rancher Advance (known in Japan as ) is the first of the Monster Rancher games to be released on Game Boy Advance.

Gameplay
Similar to the other Monster Rancher games, gameplay revolves around creating, raising, and fighting monsters. Due to the Game Boy Advance's limitations, players do not generate monsters by inserting disks into the console, but typing characters. Players can also create new monsters by combining 2 existing ones, just like the PlayStation versions. One of the differences between this and earlier Monster Ranchers is that Dino has been replaced with Zumms, as well as several species, such as Monols, having been omitted.

Reception

The game received "generally favorable reviews" according to the review aggregation website Metacritic. In Japan, Famitsu gave it a score of 30 out of 40.

References

External links
 "Monster Rancher Metropolis"
 

2001 video games
Game Boy Advance games
Game Boy Advance-only games
Monster Rancher
Video games developed in Japan